The longjawed galaxias (Galaxias prognathus) is a galaxiid of the genus Galaxias, found only in rivers and streams at mid to high altitudes on the eastern side of the Southern Alps in the South Island of New Zealand. It grows to a length of up to 9 cm.

Longjawed galaxias are slender and elongate, having coloration consisting of spots and indistinct bands of various shades of brown and grey.  The single dorsal and anal fins are about two thirds of the way along the body.  Like all galaxiids it lacks scales and has a thick, leathery skin covered with mucus.  The lower jaw is forward of the upper, giving rise to its common name.

References
 
 NIWA June 2006

longjawed galaxias
Endemic freshwater fish of New Zealand
Fish of the South Island
Taxa named by Gerald Stokell
longjawed galaxias